CITIC International Financial Holdings Limited (shortened to "CIFH", former stock code ) is the financial flagship company of the CITIC Group outside mainland China.  It is the holding company of CITIC Bank International, has a 50% stake in CITIC Capital Holdings Limited and a 40% stake in CITIC International Assets Management Limited. CITIC Group privatized CIFH in 2008.

References

External links
Official website

Government-owned companies of China
CITIC Group
Companies formerly listed on the Hong Kong Stock Exchange